Echinostrephus is a genus of echinoderms belonging to the family Echinometridae.

The species of this genus are found in Indian and Pacific Ocean.

Species
Species:

Fossils
 Echinostrephus saipanicum

References

Echinometridae